Aplopeltura is a genus of snakes of the family Pareidae. It contains a single species, Aplopeltura boa, the blunthead slug snake or blunt-headed slug-eating snake. It is a small, non-venomous snake. The species can be found in southern Thailand, Malaysia, Indonesia, Brunei and the Philippines.

A. boa eats mainly snails, especially operculate species. Their jaws are more mobile than those of most other vertebrates. With their mandibles, they cut the operculum off from their prey with a unique "sawing" motion. 

A. boa has been observed performing simple death feigning behavior. The snake rolls itself into a spiral with its belly up, staying still until the threat leaves. Unlike other death feigning snakes, A. boa does not emit a foul odor or open its mouth.

References 

Pareidae
Monotypic snake genera
Reptiles of Brunei
Reptiles of Indonesia
Reptiles of Malaysia
Reptiles of the Philippines
Reptiles of Thailand
Reptiles of Borneo
Taxa named by André Marie Constant Duméril